Dylan Walczyk (born June 25, 1993, in Rochester, New York) is an American Olympic freestyle skier who is representing the United States in the Men's Moguls event at the 2022 Winter Olympics in Beijing PRC.
  On February 3, 2022, in one of the games first rounds of competition Walzcyk placed 10th in the initial qualifying round and made it through to the event's February 5th final where he placed 16th.

References

1993 births
American male freestyle skiers
Living people
Freestyle skiers at the 2022 Winter Olympics
Olympic freestyle skiers of the United States
21st-century American people